Irakleio railway station is a station on the Piraeus–Platy railway line, located on the borders of the municipalities of Vrilissia, Maroussi, and Chalandri Greece. It was first opened on 30 July 2004 and is located in the median strip of Motorway 6, at the interchange of Pentelis Avenue, at the intersection of which with the railway line SKA - Athens International Airport has been built. Prior to its construction, it was referred to as "Ano Iraklio" station.

History
The station opened on 30 July 2004. The current station should not be confused with the old Iraklio railway station, on the Piraeus, Athens and Peloponnese Railway, which was located to the south of the current station, or to Irakleio station of the Athens metro, which is located in the old station site. In 2008, all Athens Suburban Railway services were transferred from OSE to TrainOSE. In 2009, with the Greek debt crisis unfolding OSE's Management was forced to reduce services across the network. Timetables were cut back, and routes closed as the government-run entity attempted to reduce overheads. Services from Athens Airport & Athens were cut back, with some ticket offices closing, reducing the reliability of services and passenger numbers. In 2017 OSE's passenger transport sector was privatised as TrainOSE (Now Hellenic Train), currently a wholly owned subsidiary of Ferrovie dello Stato Italiane infrastructure, including stations, remained under the control of OSE. In July 2022, the station began being served by Hellenic Train, the rebranded TranOSE.

Facilities
The station has a ticket office and cafe. At platform level, the station is equipped with Dot-matrix display departure and arrival screens on the platforms for passenger information, seating, and information boards, with access to the platforms via life or escalator. Outside the station is a bus stop where the local 500, 460, 640 & A8 call. Parking is also available at the station.

Services

Since 15 May 2022, the following weekday services call at this station:

Station layout

See also
Hellenic Railways Organization
TrainOSE
Proastiakos
P.A.Th.E./P.

References

External links
 Irakleio railway station - National Railway Network Greek Travel Pages

Marousi
West Athens (regional unit)
Attica
Railway
Buildings and structures in North Athens
Railway stations in Attica
Transport in Athens
Transport in Attica
Transport in North Athens
Railway stations opened in 2004
Railway stations in highway medians